Overprotection may refer to:
Overprotection, a strategy in chess
Helicopter parent

See also

"Overprotected", a song by Britney Spears